Katie Anne Noonan (born 2 May 1977) is an Australian singer-songwriter. In addition to a successful solo career encompassing opera, jazz, pop, rock and dance, she was the singer in the band George and remains the singer in the band Elixir; performs with her mother Maggie Noonan; and plays with her band The Captains.
Noonan was the musical director of and performed at the 2018 Commonwealth Games' opening and closing ceremonies.

Early life 
Noonan grew up with a strong background in classical music, with her mother Maggie being a well-known opera singer. She studied opera and jazz at the Queensland Conservatorium.

Career

George 

After graduation, Noonan began fronting the pop-rock group George, along with her brother Tyrone Noonan. Noonan founded George with her brother, with whom she shares lead vocals, in 1996 to enter a university music competition. After a series of successful independently released EPs, they signed to Festival Mushroom Records and released the debut album Polyserena in 2002, which debuted in the number 1 position on the Australian Recording Industry Association (ARIA) albums chart. George won the Breakthrough Artist ARIA award in 2002 and performed the song "Breathe in Now" at the award ceremony.

Elixir 

Noonan founded the jazz trio Elixir in 1997, which released their debut self-titled album in 2003. Elixir's second album, First Seed Ripening, was released on 5 August 2011. It won the 2011 ARIA Award for Best Jazz Album.

2004: Two of a Kind 
Noonan released an album of jazz and operatic duets with her mother in 2004. Entitled Two of a Kind, the album was released by the ABC Classics label.

In 2004, Noonan guest appeared at the Lord Of The Rings Symphony performances. The reviewer Murray Black said that "The undoubted highlight of the evening was guest vocalist Katie Noonan. Here is a rare talent with a voice of extraordinary beauty and versatility. In most of her solos, she sounded like a classical soprano as she soared over the orchestra with a spine-tingling, vibrato-less angelic purity. Then, in Gollum's Song and the Oscar-winning Into the West, she revealed her pop diva credentials with her strong, clear voice projecting effortlessly out in the audience."

2005: Before Time Could Change Us and Broad Festival 
Paul Grabowsky and Noonan teamed up for the jazz cycle Before Time Could Change Us. Consisting of words written by Dorothy Porter, the album tracks "the mysterious shifts and changes of a relationship". The album won the 2005 ARIA Award for Best Jazz Album.

Later in 2005, Noonan was invited by Deborah Conway to take part in the Broad Festival project—together with three other Australian female artists they performed their own and each other's songs. Sara Storer, Ruby Hunter and Clare Bowditch were the other female artists.

2007: Skin and Second Skin 
Noonan recorded a solo album entitled Skin at Sydney's Linear Recording in 2006. Produced by Andrew Klippel, Skin was released on 11 August 2007 and debuted at number 6 on the ARIA Top 50 album charts and number 1 on the Australian ARIA Top 20 album chart. The debut single, "Time To Begin", debuted at number 30 on the ARIA Top 50.

Following the success of the remix of "Time To Begin", Noonan collaborated with John Course and Mr Timothy. The collaboration involved the re-recording of Noonan's vocal tracks and a dance version of her solo album was released under the title Second Skin.

On 22 February 2008, Noonan was a support act for Cyndi Lauper at King's Park Botanic Gardens, Perth, Western Australia, and was invited on stage by Lauper to sing along to "Girls Just Want to Have Fun". Also in 2008, Noonan was featured as the vocalist in Telstra's "I Am Australian" series of advertisements.

2008: Blackbird: The Music of Lennon and McCartney 
Noonan released a jazz album of Lennon and McCartney cover versions in 2008 entitled Blackbird: The Music of Lennon and McCartney.

2010: Emperor's Box 
The Katie Noonan and the Captains' album Emperor's Box was created over a three-year period and is Noonan's second release for Sony Music. Noonan wrote all of the songs and collaborated with the following artists during the recording of the album: Tim Finn (Split Enz), Sia, Don Walker (Cold Chisel), Josh Pyke and Australian writer/poet Tom Shapcott. The album was co-produced by Noonan and Nick DiDia (Pearl Jam, Bruce Springsteen, Stone Temple Pilots, Powderfinger). It was preceded by the single "Page One" released in February.

2011–2012: Songs from the British Isles and Songs of the Southern Skies 
In 2011, Noonan collaborated with Karin Schaupp and toured Songs from the British Isles. An EP was released available only from Noonan's website. In 2012, the two recorded Songs of the Southern Skies. The album was nominated for two ARIA Awards at the 2012 ceremony.

2013: Songbook and Fierce Hearts 

In 2013, Noonan released Songbook, an album that saw Noonan re-recording songs from her time in george and Elixir. She also worked with the Sydney Dance Company on the production, Les Illuminations.

2014: Fierce Hearts 
In 2014, she released Fierce Hearts which was nominated for an ARIA Award at the 2014 ceremony. It was music alongside a contemporary circus show by Circa.

2015: Transmutant 
In 2015, Noonan released Transmutant through Universal Music Australia. The album peaked at number 33 on the ARIA Charts.

2016: With Love and Fury 
In 2016, Noonan collaborated with Brodsky Quartet and released With Love and Fury in April. They toured Australia throughout April and May.

2017: Songs of the Latin Skies 
In December 2016, Noonan announced the release  Songs of the Latin Skies with Karin Schaupp. The album due for release in February 2017 and will see the duo embark on a musical journey through the South American songbook, exploring the sounds and beats of the bossa nova, salsa, tango and samba. The duo played live shows across the country throughout 2017.

2018: Gratitude and Grief 
In 2018, Noonan reunited with Elixir and released Gratitude and Grief in August 2018. The album was nominated for Best Jazz album at the 2018 ARIA Awards.

2019: The Little Green Road to Fairyland and The Glad Tomorrow 
In April 2019, Noonan released The Little Green Road to Fairyland with Camerata and the Queensland Chamber Orchestra. In August, Noonan collaborated with The Australian String Quartet for The Glad Tomorrow. The new album sees Noonan perform uniquely Australian poetry of Queenslander and First Nations icon Oodgeroo Noonuccal to music.

2020: Late Night Tunes with Noons and The Sweetest Taboo 
In January 2020, Noonan confirmed the release of a mini-album titled Late Night Tunes with Noons. The album featured Noonan covering a range of Australian songs, with the inclusion of one original track.

In May 2020, Noonan released her twentieth album, The Sweetest Taboo, a jazz album covering 1980s pop songs.

2021: AVÉ 

In May 2021, Noonan launched the Australian Vocal Ensemble (AVÉ), an a cappella quartet. The other members are tenor Andrew Goodwin, mezzo-Soprano Fiona Campbell and bass Baritone Andrew O'Connor.

Other activities 
A National Office for Live Music was launched by Australian Prime Minister Kevin Rudd in July 2013 and, as of August 2013, Noonan is the state ambassador for Queensland.

In 2013, Noonan combined with the Sydney Dance Company and musicians from the Sydney Symphony Orchestra and conductor Richard Gill to perform Britten's song cycle Les Illuminations at Sydney's City Recital Hall Angel Place. This production was taken in 2014 to Brisbane's QPAC with the Queensland Symphony Orchestra under Johannes Fritzsch.

In 2014, Noonan was part of the I Touch Myself Project, with a mission to encourage young women to touch themselves regularly to find early signs of cancer. They released a version of "I Touch Myself" which peaked at number 72 on the ARIA singles chart.

Noonan was the official ambassador to the Adelaide Fringe in 2014.

In 2018, Noonan performed at the opening and closing ceremonies of the 2018 Commonwealth Games.

In August 2020, Noonan was unmasked as the "Sloth" in the second season of The Masked Singer Australia. She was the fourth contestant revealed, placing 9th overall.

In February 2021, Noonan was announced as the Artistic Director of the National Folk Festival.

On 25 September 2022, Noonan sang the National Anthem at the opening of the 2022 AFL Grand Final at the Melbourne Cricket Ground.

Personal life 
Noonan is married to Isaac Hurren, her longtime partner and collaborator in Elixir. They are parents to two sons.

Discography

Studio albums

Charted singles

Awards and nominations

AIR Awards 
The Australian Independent Record Awards (commonly known informally as AIR Awards) is an annual awards night to recognise, promote and celebrate the success of Australia's Independent Music sector.

! 
|-
| AIR Awards of 2011
|First Seed Ripening
| Best Independent Jazz Album
| 
| 
|-
| AIR Awards of 2020
|The Glad Tomorrow
| Best Independent Classical Album
| 
|
|-
| AIR Awards of 2021
| The Sweetest Taboo
| Best Independent Jazz Album or EP
| 
| 
|}

ARIA Music Awards 

The ARIA Music Awards are annual awards, which recognises excellence, innovation, and achievement across all genres of Australian music. Noonan has won four awards from twelve nominations. In addition to that, she won one award from eight nominations during her time with band george.

! 
|-
| 2005 || Before Time Could Change Us  (with Paul Grabowsky)|| Best Jazz Album ||  || 
|-
| 2007 || "Time to Begin" || Best Female Artist || 
|-
| 2008 || Skin || Best Adult Contemporary Album || 
|-
| 2009 || Blackbird: The Music of Lennon and McCartney || Best Jazz Album ||  || 
|-
| 2011 || First Seed Ripening  (with Elixir)|| Best Jazz Album ||  || 
|-
| rowspan="2"| 2012 ||rowspan="2"| Songs of the Southern Skies  (with Karin Schaupp)|| Best Adult Contemporary Album || 
|-
|| Best Independent Release || 
|-
| 2014 || Fierce Hearts (The Music Of Love – Song – Circus)|| Best Original Soundtrack/Cast/Show Album ||  || 
|-
| 2016 || With Love and Fury  (with Brodsky Quartet)|| Best Classical Album || 
|-
| 2017 || Songs of the Latin Skies  (with Karin Schaupp)|| Best World Music Album || 
|-
| 2018 || Gratitude and Grief  (with Elixir)|| Best Jazz Album ||  || 
|-
| 2020 || The Sweetest Taboo || Best Jazz Album ||   || 
|-

Australian Women in Music Awards 
The Australian Women in Music Awards is an annual event that celebrates outstanding women in the Australian Music Industry who have made significant and lasting contributions in their chosen field. They commenced in 2018.

! 
|-
| 2018
| Katie Noonan
| Creative Leadership Award
| 
| 
|-
| 2019
| Katie Noonan
| Creative Leadership Award
| 
| 
|-
| 2021
| Katie Noonan
| Artistic Excellence Award
| 
|

References

External links 

 Official website
 

1977 births
Living people
ARIA Award winners
Australian rock singers
Australian singer-songwriters
Australian women singer-songwriters
Australian people of Irish descent
Australian rock keyboardists
Queensland Conservatorium Griffith University alumni
21st-century Australian singers
21st-century Australian women singers
Women keyboardists